TVP Polonia (formerly known as TV Polonia) is the international channel of the Telewizja Polska (TVP). The channel is co-funded by the TVP and the Polish Ministry for Foreign Affairs and broadcasts from the TVP headquarters in Warsaw.

TVP Polonia is targeted at Polish-speaking audiences outside Poland, and it broadcasts many of the shows also broadcast by TVP's domestic channels in addition to news from Polonia/Polish communities around the world.

It was launched in October 1992 (trial) and regularly in March 1993. On 1 September 2020 HD version was launched (replacing SD version on Hot Bird 13).

Presenters 

  Monika Jóźwik (1994-2009)
  Łukasz Kardas (TV presenter; 2011-)

Distribution 
TVP Polonia is available in many countries around the world via cable or satellite. It is also transmitted unencrypted from various satellites.

Broadcasting via Astra 19.2°E started in 2005, but was ceased on 31 December 2014 due to economic reasons.

The feeds of the network in the Americas were distributed by the Canadian company Spanski Enterprises, under a 25-year agreement that ran from 13 December 1994 to 14 December 2019. In 2016, the U.S. District Court for the District of Columbia found TVP guilty of copyright infringement, based on accusations by Spanski that TVP offered streaming episodes of its programmes without geoblocking on its domestic website—infringing the exclusive rights that had been licensed to Spanski and registered by them with the United States Copyright Office. The channel's feeds in the Americas ceased transmission on 14 December 2019.

On 9 December 2011 TVP Polonia was added to terrestrial MUX3 in Poland, then removed on 19 July 2016 to free up some space for TVP Info HD. On 4 September 2020 TVP Polonia HD was added to DVB-T2 test multiplex (also known as MUX5). Unlike satellite broadcast, it is broadcasting there in 1080p50 (on the satellite, it is in 1080i).

On July 17, 2021, TVP Polonia made its return to linear TV in the USA, on both Dish Network and Sling TV (on Sling it is also available with TVP Wilno).

Logos and identities

References

External links

 
TVP Polonia at LyngSat Address

International broadcasters
Telewizja Polska
Television channels and stations established in 1992
1992 establishments in Poland
Television channels in Poland